Astronidium fraternum is a species of plant in the family Melastomataceae. It is endemic to French Polynesia.

References

fraternum
Flora of French Polynesia
Least concern plants
Taxonomy articles created by Polbot